USA Today named its first All-USA high school football team in 1982. The newspaper has named a team every year since 1982.

In addition, two members of the team are named the USA Today High School Offensive Player and Defensive Player of the Year, respectively. The newspaper also selects a USA Today High School Football Coach of the Year.

Teams

2000 team
Coach of the Year: Tony Severino (Rockhurst High School, Kansas City, Missouri)
Note: Bold denotes Offensive and Defensive Players of the Year, respectively, and ‡ denotes high school juniors

Offense

Defense

Notes

2001 team
Coach of the Year: Bob Ladouceur (De La Salle High School, Concord, California)
Note: Bold denotes Offensive and Defensive Players of the Year, respectively, and ‡ denotes high school juniors

Offense

Defense

2002 team
Coach of the Year: Bob Ladouceur (De La Salle High School, Concord, California)
Note: Bold denotes Offensive and Defensive Players of the Year, respectively, and ‡ denotes high school juniors

Offense

Defense

2003 team
Coach of the Year: Bob Ladouceur (De La Salle High School, Concord, California)
Note: Bold denotes Offensive and Defensive Players of the Year, respectively, and ‡ denotes high school juniors

Offense

Defense

2004 team
Coach of the Year: Todd Dodge (Carroll High School, Southlake, Texas)
Note: Bold denotes Offensive and Defensive Players of the Year, respectively, and ‡ denotes high school juniors

First Team Offense

First Team Defense

Second Team Offense

Second Team Defense

2005 team
Coach of the Year: Bill Castle (Lakeland High School, Lakeland, Florida)
Note: Bold denotes Offensive and Defensive Players of the Year, respectively, and ‡ denotes high school juniors

First Team Offense

First Team Defense

Second Team Offense

Second Team Defense

2006 team
Coach of the Year: J. T. Curtis (John Curtis Christian High School, River Ridge, Louisiana)
Note: Bold denotes Offensive and Defensive Players of the Year, respectively, and ‡ denotes high school juniors

First Team Offense

First Team Defense

Second Team Offense

Second Team Defense

2007 team
Coach of the Year: Tim Harris (Booker T. Washington High School, Miami, Florida)
Note: Bold denotes Offensive and Defensive Players of the Year, respectively, and ‡ denotes high school juniors

First Team Offense

First Team Defense

Second Team Offense

Second Team Defense

2008 team
Coach of the Year: George Smith (St. Thomas Aquinas High School, Fort Lauderdale, Florida)
Note: Bold denotes Offensive and Defensive Players of the Year, respectively, and ‡ denotes high school juniors

First Team Offense

First Team Defense

Second Team Offense

Second Team Defense

2009 team
Coach of the Year: Greg Toal (Don Bosco Preparatory High School, Ramsey, New Jersey)
Note: Bold denotes Offensive and Defensive Players of the Year, respectively, and ‡ denotes high school juniors

First Team Offense

First Team Defense

Second Team Offense

Second Team Defense

Accumulated stats

See also
USA Today High School Football Offensive Player of the Year

References

High school football trophies and awards in the United States